The Advance Alpha is a family of Swiss single-place, paragliders, designed and produced by Advance Thun of Thun.

Design and development
The Alpha was designed as a beginner glider for new pilots.

The design has progressed through six generations of models, the Alpha, Alpha 2, 3, 4, 5 and 6, each improving on the last. The model sizes are each named for their rough wing area in square metres.

Variants
Alpha 3 24
Small-sized model for lighter pilots. The glider model is DHV 1 certified.
Alpha 3 26
Mid-sized model for medium-weight pilots. The glider model is DHV 1 certified.
Alpha 3 28
Large-sized model for heavier pilots. The glider model is DHV 1 certified.
Alpha 3 30
Extra large-sized model for heavier pilots. The glider model is DHV 1-2 certified.
Alpha 4 23
Small-sized model for lighter pilots. Glide ratio is 8.3:1. The glider model is DHV 1 certified.
Alpha 4 25
Mid-sized model for medium-weight pilots. Glide ratio is 8.3:1. The glider model is DHV 1 certified.
Alpha 4 28
Large-sized model for heavier pilots. Glide ratio is 8.3:1. The glider model is DHV 1 certified.
Alpha 4 31
Extra large-sized model for heavier pilots. Glide ratio is 8.3:1. The glider model is DHV 1 certified.
Alpha 5 23
Small-sized model for lighter pilots. The glide ratio is 8.4:1.
Alpha 5 26
Mid-sized model for medium-weight pilots. The glide ratio is 8.4:1.
Alpha 5 28
Mid-sized model for medium-weight pilots. The glide ratio is 8.4:1.
Alpha 5 31
Large-sized model for heavier pilots. The take-off weight range is  The glide ratio is 8.4:1.
Alpha 6 22
Small-sized model for lighter pilots.
Alpha 6 24
Mid-sized model for medium-weight pilots.
Alpha 6 26
Mid-sized model for medium-weight pilots.
Alpha 6 28
Large-sized model for heavier pilots.
Alpha 6 31
Large-sized model for heavier pilots.

Specifications (Alpha 3 24)

References

External links

Alpha
Paragliders